Jannik Müller (born 18 January 1994) is a German professional footballer who plays as a defender for Darmstadt 98.

International career
Müller was a German youth international at the U19 level.

Career statistics

References

1994 births
Living people
People from Adenau
German footballers
Footballers from Rhineland-Palatinate
Association football defenders
Germany youth international footballers
1. FC Köln II players
Dynamo Dresden players
FC DAC 1904 Dunajská Streda players
SV Darmstadt 98 players
2. Bundesliga players
3. Liga players
Slovak Super Liga players
German expatriate footballers
German expatriate sportspeople in Slovakia
Expatriate footballers in Slovakia